Mohanlal is an Indian actor, director, producer, and singer who predominantly works in the Malayalam film industry. The following is the list of songs sung by Mohanlal in films and music albums. Mohanlal is the only actor to have sung this many songs in movies.

Discography 
 Denotes sole performance
 Denotes album

See also 
 List of awards and nominations received by Mohanlal
 Mohanlal filmography

References

External links 
 Mohanlal discography at Malayala Sangeetham

Mohanlal
Songs